400 Days is the tenth novel and the thirteenth book overall written by the Indian author Chetan Bhagat. It is the third installment of the author's popular Keshav-Saurabh mystery series after The Girl in Room 105(2018) and One Arranged Murder(2020).

Plot
After the incidents of One Arranged Murder, Keshav and Saurabh are living with Keshav's parents in their new apartment in a gated community called Icon. Keshav has quit his job at Cybersafe and prepares for IPS while Saurabh continues to work and is determined to get fit as he is upset with his physical appearance. One day Keshav is called by his parents to meet a woman known as Alia Arora, whom they hope to be a suitable bride for him. They are astonished to see that she also brought her child, Suhana. She is a neighbor living in the adjacent building and asks for his help to find her missing daughter Siya, who had disappeared 9 months ago. Though reluctant at first, Keshav is encouraged by his parents to take up the case as Alia had promised huge payments irrespective of the result. Keshav agrees and begins his investigations.

The story then moves to Alia's point of view where she narrates the incidents of the past 9 months and her marriage. Alia is married to Manish, a rich businessman, whose family is into jewellery businesses and is one of the richest in the area. Manish's mother is not fond of Alia, as she married Manish without her approval. The entire family always listens to their priest Shastri Ji, who has been associated with them for decades and is like a Godman to them. With his support, Manish convinces his mother to get married to Alia. However, Manish's mother constantly offends and bullies Alia, which results in Alia moving out of the joint family and goes to live in the Icon. On the day of the incident, Alia, Manish, the kids and Manish's brother Timmy and his family all gather at their parents house for a get together. The kids go to sleep and during the night Siya goes missing. The family questions each and everyone when Suhana suddenly says that she saw a 'Bad Man' who threatened to kill her sister and abducted Siya in the night and recalls a few identities of him. Despite the police's efforts and media coverage, Siya is not found. After 2 months, Alia receives an amazon package which contained Siya's bloodstained clothes and some locks of hair which belongs to her, making everyone believe that Siya is deceased. The police deems the case as a cold case and the family is okay with it as their reputation and business are no longer affected by this incident. However, Alia does not give up and believes that she can somehow find Siya and asks Keshav for assistance.

Keshav and Saurabh access Siya's phone data and unravel many shocking anecdotes. Meanwhile, Alia goes to her hometown Kochi to get some rest and Keshav travels with her to get some details from Suhana, as she is the only witness of the incident. As Keshav gains the trust of Suhana, Alia develops feelings for him as she is neglected by Manish and feels that she is happy with Keshav. Keshav too reciprocates her feelings and they end up making love multiple times, growing closer. Alia is on the verge of divorcing Manish and she plans to marry Keshav once the legal issues are over. Keshav manages to get more identities of the Abductor from Suhana, who says he wore many friendship bands and had a tattoo on his forearm, and also recalled that he smelled like a kitchen, while his hair glowed in the dark.

Keshav and Saurabh find that Siya was chatting with someone named 'Roy' on Telegram and used to send him obscene pics. They create Fake IDs on Instagram and tracks Roy, trying to trick him into getting captured. They set up a meeting and wait for Roy to appear. But he escapes at the last moment as the result of Siya's friend's mistake of posting the location online as she was posing as a little girl. Almost one year has passed since Siya disappeared and the family arranges a Puja to mark her Birthday celebrations. During the Puja, Keshav finds out that the priest Shastri ji had worn many threads in his hands and he had a tattoo on his forearm. He also applied mustard oil on his head, which is a common cooking ingredient, thus matching the details given by Suhana. Keshav plants a GPS in Shastri Ji's car and tracks his movements. He observes that the car makes regular trips in the night to an abandoned sugar factory in the suburbs of the city, covered by sugarcane fields. Keshav enlists the help of Inspector Viren and Saurabh to follow Shastri. Shastri finds this out and tries to kill Keshav but is saved by Viren. It is then revealed that Shastri had abducted and hidden Siya all these days, as he believed that it was the call of Gods. He planned this for a long time since he first met Alia and his plan was to marry Alia but when he realized it was not possible, he moved his plans towards her daughter and forcefully marries and rapes her. A weak Siya is rescued by Keshav and his team. Alia is shocked to find her daughter back and Keshav is gifted a huge amount of money from the family as a gift. One day Keshav receives a call from Siya and thanks him for rescuing her. She says that the only thing she needs now is her family and realizing that it would be selfish of him to marry Alia, he decides to move on, letting Alia and Manish stay together, for Siya and Suhana.

Keshav gives up his IPS dreams and plans about developing a software for Child security along with Saurabh.

Characters
• Keshav Rajpurohit - Main protagonist. A budding detective preparing for the Indian Police Service (IPS) from the pressure of his parents. He had a small time affair with Alia Arora.

• Saurabh Maheshwari - The second protagonist. He is Keshav Rajpurohit's best friend in the world and an engineer. He is trying to decrease his weight to be in a relationship. He is also a really good hacker and is one of the main reasons Keshav solves a case.

• Alia Arora - Keshav Rajpurohit's and Saurabh Maheswari's client. An ex-model, Manish Arora's wife, Siya and Suhana Arora's mother. She married Manish at the age of eighteen when she was impregnated by him unintentionally. Manish was 30 years old at the time. She had a small affair with Keshav Rajpurohit and wanted to marry him, but he rejected her saying that Siya and Suhana needed her at that time more than him.

• Manish Arora - Alia Arora's husband and Siya and Suhana Arora's father. He is the owner of Nava jewellers. He married Alia when he was 30 years old.

• Siya Arora - The main character the book is based on. She is the missing (kidnapped), teenage daughter of Alia and Manish Arora. She is Suhana's elder sister and loves her vastly. She's a social media and phone addict. 

• Suhana Arora - The main witness of the case. She is the younger daughter of Alia and Manish Arora, and the younger sister of Siya Arora. She is really good at board games as said by Keshav Rajpurohit.

Reception
Sankalpita from Book Geeks gave it mediocre ratings stating its plot as not so unique but easy and beginner level English.

Sahana Hegde from Scroll.in giving it mixed review said that - " Despite its clichéd ingredients, Chetan Bhagat’s new novel is his most readable yet "

References

External links

Novels by Chetan Bhagat
Indian English-language novels
Novels set in India
Novels set in Delhi
Indian thriller novels
Indian mystery novels